WPXW-TV (channel 66) is a television station licensed to Manassas, Virginia, United States, broadcasting the Ion Television network to the Washington, D.C. area. The station is owned by Ion Media, and maintains business offices in Fairfax Station, Virginia; its transmitter is located on River Road in Bethesda, Maryland. WPXW-TV is one of two Ion outlets that serve the Baltimore market (alongside Towson-licensed Class A station WMJF-CD, channel 39).

WWPX-TV (channel 60) in Martinsburg, West Virginia, operates as a full-time satellite of WPXW-TV.

History
Channel 66 signed on as WTKK, an independent religious station owned by National Capital Christian Broadcasting, in 1978. The call letters stood for "Witnessing the King of Kings". In 1982, they added some classic sitcoms and very old movies to the lineup, but by 1986, they reverted to mostly religious. From 1984 until 1986, WTKK had a sister station in Richmond, WTLL. In 1994, WTKK was purchased by ValueVision, a home shopping network, and on June 6, 1994, the call letters were changed to WVVI. Paxson Communications purchased the station in 1997, and on January 13, 1998, the call letters were changed to the current WPXW. The station was an all-infomercial channel ("inTV") from the time that Paxson bought the station until the Pax network launched on August 31, 1998. The station had the rights to the 2005 season of Baltimore Orioles games in the Washington area that were produced by MASN. It was formerly known as Pax 66, before the Pax network changed its name to i: Independent Television and later Ion Television.

Technical information

Subchannels
The station's digital signal is multiplexed:

Analog-to-digital conversion
WPXW-TV shut down its analog signal, over UHF channel 66, on June 12, 2009, the official date on which full-power television stations in the United States transitioned from analog to digital broadcasts under federal mandate. The station's digital signal moved from its pre-transition UHF channel 43 to channel 34. Through the use of PSIP, digital television receivers display the station's virtual channel as its former UHF analog channel 66, which was among the high band UHF channels (52-69) that were removed from broadcasting use as a result of the transition.

References

External links

Ion Television affiliates
Bounce TV affiliates
Court TV affiliates
Laff (TV network) affiliates
Ion Mystery affiliates
Defy TV affiliates
Scripps News affiliates
E. W. Scripps Company television stations
Television channels and stations established in 1978
1978 establishments in Virginia
PXW-TV
Manassas, Virginia